Events in 1955 in animation.

Events

January
 January 29: The pilot episode of Art Clokey's Gumby airs. It will become a full series a year later.

February
 February 12: Chuck Jones's Beanstalk Bunny premieres, starring Bugs Bunny, Daffy Duck and Elmer Fudd, produced by Warner Bros. Cartoons .

March
 March 30: 27th Academy Awards: The Mr. Magoo short film When Magoo Flew, produced by UPA and directed by Pete Burness, wins the Academy Award for Best Animated Short.

April
 April 11: Tex Avery's The Legend of Rockabye Point premieres, produced by MGM.
 April 16: Bob McKimson's The Hole Idea is first released, produced by Warner Bros. Cartoons, an animated short he directed and animated almost entirely on his own.
 April 26 - May 10: 1955 Cannes Film Festival:  Jiří Trnka's The Good Soldier Schweik premieres.

June
 June 6: Tex Avery's animated short Sh-h-h-h-h-h is first released, produced by Walter Lantz Productions. It is the final theatrical animated short made by him before his retirement.
 June 16: The Walt Disney Company releases Lady and the Tramp, directed by Clyde Geronimi, Wilfred Jackson and Hamilton Luske.

July
 July 18: Disneyland opens in Anaheim, California.

August
 August 5: Karel Zeman's Journey to the Beginning of Time premieres.

September
 September 2: Art Clokey's short film Gumbasia premieres.
 September 16: Vladimir Polkovnikov and Aleksandra Snezhko-Blotskaya's The Enchanted Boy premieres, an animated feature based on Nils Holgersson by Selma Lagerlöf.
 September 17: Speedy Gonzales, who was earlier created by Bob McKimson, appears in a remodeled version in the Friz Freleng cartoon Speedy Gonzales, produced by Warner Bros. Cartoons. It launches the character as the star of a long-running series.

October
 October 3: The first episode of The Mickey Mouse Club airs on television.
 October 28: MGM releases Deputy Droopy, a cartoon starring Droopy, directed by Tex Avery. Avery left MGM in 1953, but the cartoon was only finished and released after he left.

November
 November 11: The Tom and Jerry short film Pecos Pest is first released, produced by MGM.
 November 12: Friz Freleng's Bugs Bunny and Yosemite Sam short film Roman Legion-Hare, produced by Warner Bros. Cartoons, is first released.
 November 25: MGM releases Cellbound, a cartoon starring Spike the bulldog, directed by Tex Avery. Avery left MGM in 1953, but the cartoon was only finished and released after he left.

December
 December 10: The first episode of Mighty Mouse Playhouse airs.
 December 15: The first episode of A Rubovian Legend airs.
 December 31: Chuck Jones' One Froggy Evening, premieres, produced by Warner Bros. Cartoons. It marks the debut of Michigan J. Frog.

Specific date unknown
 Belvision Studios creates several animated television shorts for Belgian television, based on Suske en Wiske and Till Eulenspiegel by Willy Vandersteen, which are broadcast during the children's show Kom Toch Eens Kijken.
 Alberta Siegel conducts a study on the effect of cartoon violence on young children, under the title: Film-Mediated Fantasy Aggression and Strength of Aggressive Drive. She shows the Ub Iwerks cartoon The Little Red Hen and Woody Woodpecker cartoon Ace in the Hole as test subjects and notices the children play more aggressively after watching the Woody Woodpecker cartoon. A year later the test will cause debate and concern among moral guardians.

Films released

 June 22 - Lady and the Tramp (United States)
 September 16 - The Enchanted Boy (Soviet Union)
 December 23 - The Enchanted Village (Canada)
 Specific date unknown - The Devil and Kate (Czechoslovakia)

Television series 

 October 3: 
 Captain Kangaroo debuts on CBS.
 The Mickey Mouse Club debuts on ABC, on Disney Channel, and in syndication.
 December 10 - Mighty Mouse Playhouse debuts on CBS.
 December 15 - A Rubovian Legend debuts on BBC.
 December 26 - Onbu Obake debuts on Yomiuri TV.

Births

January
 January 2: Tex Brashear, American actor (voice of Tony the Tiger from Frosted Flakes, Sonny the Cuckoo Bird from Cocoa Puffs, Lucky the Leprechaun from Lucky Charms, Charlie the Tuna from StarKist).
 January 6: Rowan Atkinson, English actor, comedian and writer (voice of Zazu in The Lion King, Mr. Bean in Mr. Bean: The Animated Series).
 January 9: J.K. Simmons, American actor (voice of J. Jonah Jameson in The Avengers: Earth's Mightiest Heroes, Ultimate Spider-Man, Avengers Assemble, and Hulk and the Agents of S.M.A.S.H., White Knight in Generator Rex, Ford Pines in Gravity Falls, Yellow M&M from M&M, General Wade Eiling in Justice League Unlimited, Martin Smarty in Kim Possible, Tenzin in The Legend of Korra, Omni-Man in Invincible, Kai in Kung Fu Panda 3, Mayor Lionheart in Zootopia, the title character in Klaus, Captain Putty in Chip 'n Dale Rescue Rangers).
 January 12: Tom Ardolino, American rock drummer and member of NRBQ (voiced himself in The Simpsons episodes "The Old Man and the "C" Student", "Take My Wife, Sleaze" and "Insane Clown Poppy"), (d. 2012).
 January 14: Nancy Linari, American actress (voice of Aunt May in Spider-Man, Julia in The Real Adventures of Jonny Quest, Morticia Addams in The Addams Family, Martha Barriga in Steven Universe).
 January 15: Miyuki Hoshikawa, Japanese animator (Noozles, Disney Television Animation, CatDog) and storyboard artist (Nickelodeon Animation Studio, Cartoon Network Studios, Warner Bros. Animation, The Cleveland Show, Special Agent Oso, Big Hero 6: The Series).
 January 21: Karsten Kiilerich, Danish film and television director, screenwriter and animator (When Life Departs, Help! I'm a Fish, The Ugly Duckling and Me!, Albert, The Little Vampire 3D, Up and Away, Raggie).
 January 27: Kerrigan Mahan, American actor (voice of Bunta Fujiwara in Initial D, Yamcha in Dragon Ball, Edwin Alva in Static Shock).

February
 February 1: David Wise, American television scriptwriter (Star Trek: The Animated Series, The Transformers, Teenage Mutant Ninja Turtles, Chip 'n Dale: Rescue Rangers, Batman: The Animated Series), (d. 2020).
 February 7: Miguel Ferrer, American actor (voice of Shan Yu in Mulan, Death in Adventure Time, Tarakudo in Jackie Chan Adventures, Vandal Savage in Young Justice, Aquaman and Weather Wizard in Superman: The Animated Series, Agent Hopkins in the American Dad! episode "American Dream Factory", Magister Hulka in the Ben 10: Ultimate Alien episode "Basic Training"), (d. 2017).
 February 8: Jerry Beck, American animation historian, author, blogger and video producer (wrote The 50 Greatest Cartoons).
 February 9: Jim J. Bullock, American actor and comedian (voice of the Magistrate in The Scarecrow, Trye, Majestrate, Eraatus, Isaac and Licca in Animated Stories from the New Testament, the title character in Queer Duck, Bouty in the Animated Hero Classics episode "Marie Curie", Jacques-Jean and Emerald Joe in the Rick & Steve: The Happiest Gay Couple in All the World episode "Wickeder").
 February 15: Christopher McDonald, American actor (voice of Kent Mansley in The Iron Giant, Jor-El in Superman: The Animated Series and Justice League Unlimited, Hego in Kim Possible, Captain Nemesis in Ben 10: Ultimate Alien and Ben 10: Omniverse, Two-Face in Beware the Batman, Superman in the Batman Beyond episode "The Call").
 February 16: Peter Siragusa, American actor (voice of Bruton in Dinosaur, Rufus in Cloudy with a Chance of Meatballs, additional voices in Cloudy with a Chance of Meatballs 2, Home on the Range, and Mickey's Twice Upon a Christmas), (d. 2022).
 February 21: Kelsey Grammer, American actor (voice of Sideshow Bob in The Simpsons, Dr. Frankenollie in Runaway Brain, Vladimir in Anastasia, Stinky Pete in Toy Story 2, the title character in Gary the Rat, Blinky Galadrigal in Trollhunters: Tales of Arcadia, Hunter in Storks).
 February 23: Tom Bodett, American writer and radio host (voice of the "Mime Time" and "Good Idea/Bad Idea" Narrator in Animaniacs).
 February 24: Steve Jobs, American business magnate (co-founder of Pixar), (d. 2011).
 February 27: Lou Hirsch, American actor (voice of Baby Herman in Who Framed Roger Rabbit, Chuck Gopher and Nacho in Gophers!, additional voices in We're Back! A Dinosaur's Story).
 February 28: Gilbert Gottfried, American actor and comedian (voice of Iago in the Aladdin franchise and House of Mouse, Digit and Widget in Cyberchase, Mr. Peabody in Problem Child, Mister Mxyzptlk in Superman: The Animated Series and Justice League Action, Berkeley Beetle in Thumbelina, Art DeSalvo in Duckman, Kraang Subprime in Teenage Mutant Ninja Turtles, Mario Zucchini in Animal Crackers, Clion in the Hercules episode "Hercules and the Assassin", Santa Claus in The Grim Adventures of Billy & Mandy episode "Billy and Mandy Save Christmas", Rick Platypus in the My Gym Partner's a Monkey episode "That Darn Platypus", Genie in The Tom and Jerry Show episode "Meanie Genie", Sal in the SpongeBob SquarePants episode "The Hankering", Coal Miner in the Teen Titans Go! episode "Christmas Crusaders", God in the Smiling Friends episode "Charlie Dies and Doesn't Come Back", himself in Dr. Katz, Professional Therapist, Celebrity Deathmatch, and The Replacements episode "A Buzzwork Orange"), (d. 2022).

March
 March 5: Penn Jillette, American magician, actor, musician, inventor, television presenter and author (guest starred in the Fetch! with Ruff Ruffman episode "You Can't Teach an Orange Dog New Tricks", voice of Flea in The Moxy Show, TV Announcer in Toy Story, Pluto Devil in Mickey Mouse Works and House of Mouse, Fortune Teller, Pawn Shop Owner and Ticket Man in ¡Mucha Lucha!: The Return of El Maléfico, The Great Who Who Dini in T.O.T.S., Frank Grimes in the Nightmare Ned episode "Lucky Abe", Magic Marty in the Handy Manny episode "Squeeze's Magic Show", Magical Johnson in The Cleveland Show episode "Brown Magic", himself in The Simpsons episodes "Hello Gutter, Hello Fadder" and "The Great Simpsina", the Futurama episode "Into The Wild Green Yonder", and the Scooby-Doo and Guess Who? episode "The Cursed Cabinet of Professor Madds Markson!").
 March 6: Larry Cedar, American actor (voice of Mr. Pibbles in Samurai Jack, Oblongata, Hans, Anton Mohans, and Chip Clavicle in Freakazoid!, Howell Wainwright in the Ben 10 episode "A Small Problem").
 March 12: Celia Kendrick, American animator (The Simpsons), storyboard artist (The Simpsons, Warner Bros. Animation, Disney Television Animation, Duckman, I Am Weasel, Nickelodeon Animation Studio, Rugrats, The Proud Family, Beavis and Butt-Head, Napoleon Dynamite, Curious George, Curious George 3: Back to the Jungle, Puppy Dog Pals, The VeggieTales Show), writer (New Looney Tunes) and director (Rugrats).
 March 19: Bruce Willis, German-born American retired actor (voice of the title character in Bruno the Kid, Muddy Grimes in Beavis and Butt-Head Do America, Spike in Rugrats Go Wild, RJ in Over the Hedge, himself in The Lego Movie 2: The Second Part).
 March 28: Reba McEntire, American country singer (voice of Dixie in The Fox and the Hound 2, Etta in The Land Before Time XIV: Journey of the Brave, Joy Jenkins in Spies in Disguise, Artemis in Hercules).
 March 29: Marina Sirtis, English actress (voice of Demona in Gargoyles, Queen Bee in Young Justice, Deanna Troi in Star Trek: Lower Decks, Cosma in OK K.O.! Let's Be Heroes, Aurora Abromowitz in the Duckman episode "Where No Duckman Has Gone Before", Samantha the Warrior Dog in the Adventure Time episode "The Pit", herself in the Family Guy episode "Not All Dogs Go to Heaven").
 March 30: Humberto Vélez, Mexican voice actor (dub voice of Homer Simpson in seasons 1-15 and 32-present of The Simpsons, Peter Griffin in seasons 1 and 2 of Family Guy, Professor Farnsworth and Kif Kroker in seasons 1-4 of Futurama, Lord Farquaad in Shrek, Roz in Monsters, Inc., John Silver in Treasure Planet, Hondo Ohnaka in Star Wars: The Clone Wars, continued voice of Winnie the Pooh).

April
 April 6: Michael Stark, Canadian actor (voice of Kooky von Koopa in The Adventures of Super Mario Bros. 3 and Super Mario World, additional voices in Hammerman).
 April 15: Ryūtarō Nakamura, Japanese film director and animator (Serial Experiments Lain, Kino's Journey, Ghost Hound, Despera), (d. 2013).
 April 18: Keith Kaczorek, American television writer (Hey Arnold!, The Angry Beavers, The Backyardigans, Sid the Science Kid, Star vs. the Forces of Evil).
 April 29: 
Kate Mulgrew, American actress (voice of Red Claw in Batman: The Animated Series, Cressa in The Pirates of Dark Water, Queen Hippsodeth in Aladdin, Anastasia Renard/Titania in Gargoyles, Dr. C. in Stretch Armstrong and the Flex Fighters, Samantha the cat in Infinity Train, Kathryn Janeway in Star Trek: Prodigy, Isis in the Mighty Max episode "The Mommy's Hand", June Rosewood in the American Dad! episode "A Star Is Reborn", General Zera in the Teenage Mutant Ninja Turtles episode "Half Shell Heroes: Blast to the Past").
Richard Epcar, American actor (voice of Batou in Ghost in the Shell, Daisuke Jigen in Lupin the Third, the title character in Bobobo-bo Bo-bobo, Zangetsu in Bleach).
Leslie Jordan, American actor (voice of Beauregard LaFontaine in American Dad!, additional voices in Roadside Romeo and Glenn Martin, DDS), (d. 2022).
 Specific date unknown: Terry Brain, British animator (The Trap Door, Wallace & Gromit), (d. 2016).

May
 May 1: Eric Goldberg, American animator, actor and film director (Walt Disney Animation Studios).
 May 10: Chris Berman, American sportscaster (voiced himself in the Clone High episode "Homecoming: "A Shot in D'Arc" and the American Dad! episode "Fantasy Baseball").
 May 13: María Cecilia Botero, Colombian actress (voice of Alma Madrigal in Encanto).
 May 14: Dave Hoover, American comics artist and animator (Wanderers, Starman, Captain America), (d. 2011).
 May 17:
 Pat Irwin, American composer and musician (Rocko's Modern Life, Pepper Ann, JetCat, Class of 3000, composed the theme song of My Gym Partner's a Monkey).
 Bill Paxton, American actor and filmmaker (voice of Eddie Beck in Pixels), (d. 2017).
 Marc Weiner, American actor (voice of Swiper, Map and the Fiesta Trio in Dora the Explorer).
 May 29: David Kirschner, American film and television producer and screenwriter (Hanna-Barbera, An American Tail, Curious George).
 May 31: Susie Essman, American comedian, actress, writer and producer (voice of Mittens in Bolt, Mrs. Lonstein in American Dad!, Sadie in the Kim Possible episode "Car Trouble", Queen Bee in the Dora the Explorer episode "Dora's First Trip", Barb in the Adventure Time episode "Web Weirdos", Sharon and Grandma Quinzel in the Harley Quinn episode "Bensonhurst", Lorraine in the Bob's Burgers episode "Sauce Side Story", herself in the Dr. Katz, Professional Therapist episode "Waltz").

June
 June 2: Dana Carvey, American actor and comedian (voice of Pops in The Secret Life of Pets franchise, Dana in Hotel Transylvania 2, Leonard in the Rick and Morty episode "Anatomy Park").
 June 3: Phil Nibbelink, American animator (Banjo the Woodpile Cat, Walt Disney Animation Studios, Casper, The Iron Giant), storyboard artist (Wolverine and the X-Men, Animal Crackers) and film director (An American Tail: Fievel Goes West, We're Back! A Dinosaur's Story, Puss in Boots, Romeo & Juliet: Sealed with a Kiss, Marmaduke).
 June 4: Mary Testa, American actress (voice of Shirley the Medium in Courage the Cowardly Dog, additional voices in Buster & Chauncey's Silent Night).
 June 6:
 Sam Simon, American television director, producer, designer and writer (The Simpsons), (d. 2015).
 Sandra Bernhard, American actress (voice of Cassandra in Hercules, Gsptlsnz in the Superman: The Animated Series episode "Mzyzpixilated", Sandra in the Dr. Katz, Professional Therapist episode "A Journey for the Betterment of People").
 June 9: Teddy Eccles, American actor (voice of Dorno in The Herculoids, the title character in The Little Drummer Boy).
 June 16:
 Laurie Metcalf, American actress (voice of Mrs. Davis in the Toy Story franchise, Sarah Hawkins in Treasure Planet, Lucille Krunklehorn in Meet the Robinsons, Donna Allman in God, the Devil and Bob).
 Tree Rollins, American former professional basketball player (voiced himself in The Simpsons episode "Treehouse of Horror XXXII").
 June 26:
 Gedde Watanabe, American actor and comedian (voice of Ling in Mulan and Mulan II, Emperor and Nuri in Happily Ever After: Fairy Tales for Every Child, Kangaroo and Zack in Rugrats, Principal and Dr. Suzuki in Batman Beyond, James in Whatever Happened to... Robot Jones?, Kenji in Scooby-Doo! and the Samurai Sword, Hamster Mitch and Tourist Alien in Bravest Warriors, Reo in the Puppy Dog Pals episode "Land of the Rising Pup", Ninja in the Duckman episode "The Mallardian Candidate", Factory Foreman in The Simpsons episode "In Marge We Trust", Mr. Min in The Proud Family episode "EZ Jackster", Vincent Wong in the What's New, Scooby-Doo? episode "Lights! Camera! Mayhem!", Long Duk Dong in the Family Guy episode "Mother Tucker").
 Yvette Kaplan, American animator (HBO Storybook Musicals), storyboard artist (Doug), sheet timer (Codename: Kids Next Door, My Scene: Masquerade Madness, Sit Down, Shut Up, Curious George, Futurama, Stretch Armstrong and the Flex Fighters, DuckTales, Chicago Party Aunt, Harriet the Spy), consultant (The Magic School Bus, Cyberchase), voice director (Random! Cartoons), writer (Ice Age, Clarence), producer (Generation O!, Arthur's Missing Pal, Beavis and Butt-Head, Clarence, Sonic Boom) and director (Doug, Beavis and Butt-Head, Oh Yeah! Cartoons, Cyberchase, King of the Hill, Arthur's Missing Pal, Happily N'Ever After, Random! Cartoons, co-creator of Zack & Quack).

July
 July 1: Ian Wilcox, American background artist (King of the Hill, Family Guy, The Simpsons), (d. 2022).
 July 3: Jesse Corti, American actor and theater director (voice of LeFou in Beauty and the Beast, March Hare in Bonkers, Angel Rojas in The Batman).
 July 10: Denise Sirkot, American production manager and producer (The Simpsons, The Critic).
 July 22: Willem Dafoe, American actor (voice of The Commandant and Mr. Lassen in The Simpsons, Hunter in Globehunters: An Around the World in 80 Days Adventure, Gill in Finding Nemo and Finding Dory, Rat in Fantastic Mr. Fox, Yves in Birds of a Feather).
 July 26: Michele Pillar, American singer, songwriter and actress (performed the song "(You Make Me Feel Like) A Natural Woman" in The Simpsons episode "Selma's Choice").
 July 29: Dave Stevens, American illustrator and comics artist (Hanna-Barbera), (d. 2008).

August
 August 3: Corey Burton, American actor (voice of Dale and Zipper in Chip 'n Dale: Rescue Rangers, Brainiac in the DC Animated Universe and Legion of Super Heroes, Shockwave in The Transformers, Tomax in G.I. Joe: A Real American Hero, Count Dooku and Cad Bane in the Star Wars franchise, the Lizard in Spider-Man, Gruffi Gummi and Toadwart in Adventures of the Gummi Bears, Zeus in Hercules, Gaetan Molière in Atlantis: The Lost Empire, V.V. Argost in The Secret Saturdays, Malware, Mr. Baumann, and Brainstorm in Ben 10: Omniverse, Liquidator in DuckTales, Invisibo in the Freakazoid! episode "Tomb of Invisibo", continued voice of Captain Hook and Ludwig von Drake).
 August 7: Wayne Knight, American actor (voice of Tantor in Tarzan, Al McWhiggin in Toy Story 2, Zurg in Buzz Lightyear of Star Command, Mr. Blik in Catscratch, Baron Von Sheldgoose in Legend of the Three Caballeros, Penguin in Harley Quinn, Mr. Blik in Catscratch, Dojo Kanojo Cho in Xiaolin Showdown, Elihas Starr/Egghead in The Super Hero Squad Show, Jack O'Lantern in The Grim Adventures of Billy & Mandy episode "Billy & Mandy's Jacked-Up Halloween", Captain Goray in the Green Lantern: The Animated Series episode "Into the Abyss").
 August 19: Peter Gallagher, American actor (voice of Dell Clawthorne in The Owl House, Mole King in The Adventures of Tom Thumb and Thumbelina, Kurt in the Superman: The Animated Series episode "Where There's Smoke", Jared in the Family Guy episode "Lethal Weapons").
 August 21: Gary Apple, American television writer (The Simpsons, Doug, Sabrina, the Animated Series, Oswald, Time Warp Trio).
 August 29: Vera Lanpher-Pacheco, American animator (Walt Disney Animation Studios) and voice actor (voice of Daphne in Dragon's Lair), (d. 2021).

September
 September 6: Bruno Bianchi, French animator and comics artist (Inspector Gadget, DIC Entertainment, SIP Animation), (d. 2011).
 September 7: Mira Furlan, Croatian-born American actress and singer (voice of Silver Sable in Spider-Man, Babette in Arcane), (d. 2021).
 September 8: Stephen J. Lineweaver, American production designer, art director and visual consultant (The Simpsons).
 September 9:
 John Kricfalusi, Canadian former animator (American Pop, Hanna-Barbera, Tiny Toon Adventures, Free Birds, animated the couch gags for The Simpsons episodes "Bart Stops to Smell the Roosevelts" and "Treehouse of Horror XXVI"), storyboard artist (Filmation), blogger, voice actor (voice of Ren Höek and Mr. Horse in The Ren & Stimpy Show and Ren & Stimpy "Adult Party Cartoon", Bowling Alley Guy in The X's episode "Pinheads"), director and producer (Mighty Mouse: The New Adventures, The New Adventures of Beany and Cecil, creator of The Ren & Stimpy Show, The Ripping Friends and Ren & Stimpy "Adult Party Cartoon", co-founder of Spümcø).
 Edward Hibbert, English actor (voice of Evil the Cat in Earthworm Jim, Zazu in The Lion King II: Simba's Pride and Timon & Pumbaa).
 September 11: Mike Docherty, Scottish comics artist and animator, (d. 2016).
 September 12: Peter Scolari, American actor (voice of John Hammer and The Shark/Gunther Hardwicke in Batman: The Animated Series, Preston Vogel in Gargoyles, Brad in the Duckman episode "From Brad to Worse", Wilford B. Wolf in the Animaniacs episode "Moon Over Minerva", Professor Higgenson in the What's New, Scooby-Doo? episode "Scooby-Doo Christmas", Ray Palmer/Atom in the Batman: The Brave and the Bold episode "Sword of the Atom!"), (d. 2021).
 September 15:
 Bruce Reitherman, American actor and son of Wolfgang Reitherman (voice of Christopher Robin in Winnie the Pooh and the Honey Tree and Mowgli in The Jungle Book).
 Nathan Carlson, American voice actor, musician and writer (voice of Dr. Cyborn in Skeleton Warriors, Weatherman, Sports Announcer, Spin & Speak and Husband in Rugrats, Whizzer in The Swan Princess III: The Mystery of the Enchanted Treasure, various characters in Hi Hi Puffy AmiYumi, Goofy Grape and Lefty Lemon in Funny Face).
 September 17: Charles Martinet, American voice actor (voice of Mario, Luigi, Wario and Waluigi in the Mario franchise, Senator Wilson Philips and Speedwagon Foundation Pilot in JoJo's Bizarre Adventure, Magenta in Dragon Ball Super: Super Hero, TBA in The Super Mario Bros. Movie).
 September 18: 
 Bob Papenbrook, American actor (voice of Katsuhito Masaki and Nobuyuki Masaki in Tenchi Muyo!), (d. 2006).
 David Mirkin, American screenwriter, director and producer (The Simpsons).
 September 26: George Daugherty, American conductor (Looney Tunes), director, writer and producer (Peter and the Wolf, Sagwa, the Chinese Siamese Cat).

October
 October 12: Russell Calabrese, American animator (The Berenstain Bears specials, Strawberry Shortcake in Big Apple City, Warner Bros. Animation, Garfield Gets a Life, The Thief and the Cobbler), storyboard artist (Animaniacs, The Ant Bully), background artist (Animaniacs, Pinky and the Brain), animation checker (Dan Vs.), sheet timer (Film Roman, Warner Bros. Animation, Johnny Bravo, Disney Television Animation, Jackie Chan Adventures, Cartoon Network Studios), writer (Johnny Bravo) and director (Warner Bros. Animation, Johnny Bravo, The Grim Adventures of Billy & Mandy, Camp Lazlo, Fanboy & Chum Chum, Phineas and Ferb, Randy Cunningham: 9th Grade Ninja).
 October 14: Arleen Sorkin, American retired actress (voice of Harley Quinn in the DC Animated Universe, Ms. Bambi in Batman: Mask of the Phantasm, Veronica in the Taz-Mania episode "Bewitched Bob").
 October 20: Thomas Newman, American composer (Pixar).
 October 29: Gary Leib, American cartoonist, musician and animator (founder of the animation studio Twinkle), (d. 2021).
 October 30: Daryl L. Coley, American singer (voice of Bleeding Gums Murphy in The Simpsons episode "Dancin' Homer"), (d. 2016).

November
 November 3: Flint Dille, American screenwriter (Sunbow Productions, An American Tail: Fievel Goes West).
 November 13: Whoopi Goldberg, American actress, comedienne, author and television personality (voice of Gaia in seasons 1-3 of Captain Planet and the Planeteers, Shenzi in The Lion King and The Lion King 1½, Fantasy in The Pagemaster, Mother Olm in Amphibia, Zenobia the Hoodoo Diva and Mother Gooseberg in Happily Ever After: Fairy Tales for Every Child, Ghost of Christmas Present in A Christmas Carol, Stormella in Rudolph the Red-Nosed Reindeer: The Movie, Ranger Margaret in The Rugrats Movie, Mrs. Peck in Our Friend, Martin, Ransome in Foxbusters, Miss Clavel in Madeline: Lost in Paris, Cyberina in Pinocchio 3000, Ermintrude in Doogal, Darlin in Everyone's Hero, Stretch in Toy Story 3, The Tower in The Little Engine That Could, Magic Mirror in The 7D,  Barb in Summer Camp Island, Mama Zho Zi in A Warrior's Tail, The Gamemaster in Miles from Tomorrowland, Meg and Miss Bee in The Stinky & Dirty Show, Lama in Elena of Avalor, Captain in Luck, Deborah Samson in the Liberty's Kids episode "Deborah Samson: Soldier of the Revolution", Dorothy in the Animals episode "Dog.", Mikhaela in the BoJack Horseman episode "The Light Bulb Scene", Marian Pouncy and Poundcakes in the M.O.D.O.K. episode "If Saturday Be... for the Boys!", the Narrator in the Tuca & Bertie episode "The Flood", herself in the Dr. Katz Professional Therapist episode "Lerapy", the Celebrity Deathmatch episode "Celebrity Deathmatch Special Report", and the Scooby-Doo and Guess Who? episode "The Nightmare Ghost of Psychic U!").
 November 15: Michael Peraza, Cuban-American animator, art director, conceptual artist and animation historian (Walt Disney Animation Studios).
 November 19: Debbi Besserglick, Israeli actress (Hebrew dub voice of Arthur Read), (d. 2005).
 November 25: 
 Cheri Steinkellner, American television writer and producer (co-creator of Teacher's Pet).
 Don Hahn, American film producer (Walt Disney Animation Studios).
 November 27: Bill Nye, American television personality and engineer (voice of Professor Rubicon in Miles from Tomorrowland, himself in the American Dad! episode "Brave N00b World" and the Scooby-Doo and Guess Who? episode "Space Station Scooby!").
 November 29: Howie Mandel, Canadian comedian, television personality, screenwriter, actor, producer, director, entrepreneur, game show host and author (voice of Skeeter, Animal and Bunsen in Muppet Babies, Jack in The Tangerine Bear, Comet in Timothy Tweedle the First Christmas Elf, Spencer in Pinocchio 3000, Brian Booyah in The Dating Guy, FBI Agent Rick Chickmagnet in the Fugget About It episode "The Fugly American", himself in the Glenn Martin, DDS episode "Bust 'Em Up", the Robot Chicken episode "3 2 1 2 333, 222, 3...66?", and the Harley Quinn episode "A High Bar", creator and voice of Bobby Generic and Howard Generic in Bobby's World).
 November 30: Kevin Conroy, American actor (voice of Batman in the DC Animated Universe, DC Universe Animated Original Movies, Batman: Strange Days, Justice League Action, Teen Titans Go!, and Scooby-Doo and Guess Who?, Phantom Stranger and Batman of Zur-En-Arrh in Batman: The Brave and the Bold, Captain Sunshine in The Venture Bros., Prismal in Welcome to the Wayne, Mer-Man in Masters of the Universe: Revelation, Hordak in He-Man and the Masters of the Universe episode "The Beginning of the End, Part 2", Bellicus in the Ben 10: Alien Force episode "X = Ben + 2", John Grayson in The Batman episode "A Matter of Family"), (d. 2022).

December
 December 3: Andrea Romano, American voice director (Hanna-Barbera, Warner Bros. Animation).
 December 5: Richard Gibbs, American music producer and composer (The Simpsons, 101 Dalmatians II: Patch's London Adventure).
 December 6: Steven Wright, American actor, comedian, writer and film producer (voice of Speed in The Swan Princess, Bootes in Hercules, Meh Meh in The Emoji Movie, Bogeyman in the Happily Ever After: Fairy Tales for Every Child episode "Mother Goose: A Rappin' and Rhymin' Special", Danny in the Aqua Teen Hunger Force episode "Allen: Part One", himself in the Dr. Katz, Professional Therapist episodes "Bystander Ben" and "Mask", and The Simpsons episode "The Last Temptation of Krust").
 December 16:
 Xander Berkeley, American actor (voice of Iago/Coldsteel in Gargoyles, Mysterio in The Spectacular Spider-Man, Sinestro in Batman: The Brave and the Bold, Morgg and Trukk in the Ben 10: Ultimate Alien episode "...Nor Iron Bars a Cage").
 Catherine Peterson, American ink & paint artist (Hanna-Barbera, The Secret of NIMH, Shelley Duvall's Bedtime Stories, Cool World) and animation checker (Hanna-Barbera, Walt Disney Animation Studios), (d. 2021).
 December 18: Mitch Schauer, American animator, storyboard artist (Hanna-Barbera, Garfield and Friends, Bobby's World, Tom and Jerry: The Movie, Bionicle: Mask of Light, Niko and the Sword of Light), writer (3-2-1 Penguins!), director (Garfield and Friends) and producer (Wild West C.O.W.-Boys of Moo Mesa, Freakazoid!, Hulk and the Agents of S.M.A.S.H., creator of The Angry Beavers).
 December 19: Bronwen Barry, Canadian-American animator (Hanna-Barbera, Filmation, Tummy Trouble, The Simpsons, Rugrats, Looney Tunes, FernGully: The Last Rainforest, The Thief and the Cobbler, Nest Family Entertainment, Rich Animation Studios, Looney Tunes: Back in Action, Curious George, Family Guy), storyboard artist (King of the Hill, Happiness Is a Warm Blanket, Charlie Brown, Randy Cunningham: 9th Grade Ninja, Kulipari, The 7D, Lego DC Super Hero Girls: Super-Villain High) and character designer (Ghostbusters, She-Ra: Princess of Power, Rich Animation Studios).
 December 24:
 David Richardson, American television writer and producer (The Simpsons, F Is for Family), (d. 2021).
 Randy Crenshaw, American actor and singer (voice of Mr. Hyde in The Nightmare Before Christmas, additional voices in Family Guy, Centaurworld, House of Mouse, Dexter's Laboratory, The Ren & Stimpy Show, and Freakazoid!).
 December 29: Dan Kuenster, American animator and director (Sullivan Bluth Studios).
 December 30: Sheryl Lee Ralph, American actress (voice of Rita in Oliver & Company, Aunt Dee in The Proud Family, Cheetah in Justice League and Justice League Unlimited, Amanda Waller in Young Justice, Trina Jessup in Static Shock).

Specific date unknown
 Antón Cancelas, Spanish actor (Spanish dub synchronisation of Saint Seiya), (d. 2021).

Deaths

July
 July 4: Perce Pearce, American animation director, producer, writer (Walt Disney Company) and actor (voice of the mole in Bambi), dies at age 55.

Specific date unknown
 Erich F.T. Schenk, German-American painter, illustrator, animator and comics artist (Fleischer Studios), dies at age 53 or 54.

See also
List of anime by release date (1946–1959)

References

External links
Animated works of the year, listed in the IMDb